Arthur Saunders Gore, 5th Earl of Arran  (6 January 1839 – 14 March 1901), known as Viscount Sudley from 1839 to 1884, was an Anglo-Irish peer and diplomat.

Early life
Arran was the eldest son of Philip Yorke Gore, 4th Earl of Arran, and Elizabeth Marianne Napier, daughter of General Sir William Francis Patrick Napier, KCB. He was educated at Eton College, and subsequently entered the diplomatic service.

Diplomatic and public career
He was appointed High Sheriff of Donegal in 1863. He was an Attaché at the British embassies in Hanover, Stuttgart, Lisbon and Paris as well as a Special Commissioner for Income Tax from 1865 to 1881 and a Commissioner of Customs from 1883 to 1884. In 1884 he succeeded his father as fifth Earl of Arran but as this was an Irish peerage it did not entitle him to a seat in the House of Lords. However, later the same year he was created Baron Sudley, of Castle Gore in the County of Mayo, in the Peerage of the United Kingdom, which gave him an automatic seat in the upper chamber of Parliament. He later served as Lord Lieutenant of County Mayo from 1889 to 1901 and was made a Knight of the Order of St Patrick in 1898.

Family
Lord Arran married, firstly in 1865, Honourable Edith Elizabeth Henrietta Jocelyn (1845–1871), daughter of Robert Jocelyn, Viscount Jocelyn. They had one son and three daughters before she died early in 1871. Among the children were:

Lady Mabell Frances Elizabeth Gore (1866–1956), she married David Ogilvy, 11th Earl of Airlie on 19 January 1886. They have six children.
Lady Cicely Alice Gore (1867–1955), she married James Gascoyne-Cecil, the 4th Marquess of Salisbury on 17 May 1887. They have four children.
Arthur Gore, 6th Earl of Arran (1868–1958), he married Mathilde Huyssen van Kattendijke on 16 August 1902. They have two sons, two grandsons, two great-great-granddaughters and four great-great-great-grandchildren. He remarried Lilian Quick on 17 December 1929.
Lady Esther Georgiana Caroline Gore (1870–1955), she married Frederick Smith, 2nd Viscount Hambleden on 26 July 1894. They have five children.

Twenty years after his first wife's death, Lord Arran remarried, in 1889, Winifred Ellen Reilly, daughter of John Reilly, and widow of the Hon. John Montagu Stopford. She was formerly a lady-in-waiting to Princess Christian of Schleswig-Holstein. They had one daughter:
Lady Winifred Helene Lettice Gore (1891–1958)

Lord Arran died in March 1901, aged 62, and was succeeded in his titles by his only son Arthur. Lady Arran died in 1921.

References

External links

1839 births
1901 deaths
People educated at Eton College
Knights of St Patrick
Lord-Lieutenants of Mayo
High Sheriffs of Donegal
Arthur
Earls of Arran (Ireland)
Peers of the United Kingdom created by Queen Victoria